Mechanicsville Road Bridge is a covered bridge spanning the Grand River in Austinburg Township, Ashtabula County, Ohio, United States.  The bridge, one of currently 17 drivable bridges in the county, is the longest single span covered bridge in the county, and is believed to be the oldest in the county as well.  The bridge is a Howe truss design, with laminated arches added during its renovation in 2003-04.  The bridge’s WGCB number is 35-04-18, and it is located approximately 4.3 mi (7.0 km) southeast of Geneva.

History
1867 – Bridge constructed.
unknown – The bridge was closed to traffic until the renovations were completed in 2004.
unknown – Mechanicsville Road was rerouted from just west of the bridge to just east and north across a new bridge.
2003-04 – Bridge renovated.
2004 – Bridge rededicated and reopened to traffic.

Dimensions
Length: 156 feet (0.0 m)

Gallery

See also
List of Ashtabula County covered bridges

References

External links
Ohio Covered Bridges List
Ohio Covered Bridge Homepage
The Covered Bridge Numbering System
Ohio Historic Bridge Association
Mechanicsville Road Covered Bridge from Ohio Covered Bridges, Historic Bridges

Covered bridges in Ashtabula County, Ohio
Bridges completed in 1867
Road bridges in Ohio
1867 establishments in Ohio
Wooden bridges in Ohio
Howe truss bridges in the United States